Kelita may refer to:
 Kelita (biblical figure), minor character from the Old Testament
 Kelita (bee), a genus of bees in the family Apidae
 Kelita (plant), a genus of plants in the family Amaranthaceae